Harold Abraham McRae (born July 10, 1945) is a former left fielder in Major League Baseball who played for the Cincinnati Reds (1968, 1970–72) and Kansas City Royals (1973–87). Utilized as a designated hitter for most of his career, McRae batted and threw right-handed.  He is the father of former major league outfielder Brian McRae.

Biography

Playing career
McRae was selected by the Reds in the 6th round of the 1965 draft with the 117th overall pick.  Then in the pre-1969 offseason, playing winter ball in Puerto Rico, McRae suffered a multiple leg fracture sliding on the basepaths.  In the words of Bill James in The Bill James Historical Baseball Abstract, "Before the accident, McRae was a burner, a center fielder who could fly...after the accident, his speed was major league average." He was considered a below-average outfielder with the Reds.

In spring training 1969, McRae came to the Reds' camp with his leg still in a cast from the fracture. The same offseason, St. Louis Cardinals announcer Harry Caray had suffered multiple fractures being struck by a car while on foot. During a Reds-Cardinals preseason game where Caray was interviewing ballplayers on the field while still on crutches, Reds Manager Dave Bristol pointed in Caray's direction and said to McRae, "Look at that. There's an old man. Broke two legs. Broke his shoulder.  Broke his everything. And here he is walking around doing his job, doing anything he wants. Here you are, all you did was break your leg sliding into second base, and you can't get your leg out of your goddam cast! You ought to be ashamed of yourself."

McRae later mentioned to Caray that it was "one of the best motivational speeches he'd ever heard.  He learned that he had to want to recover before he'd really be able to." Later in his career, Royals teammate Dan Quisenberry recalled, whenever a Royals player took time off because of injury, "McRae gets dressed like a commando, hides in a trash can in the clubhouse, and then jumps out and 'shoots' the guy...McRae believes that if a guy is hurt and can't play, he's dead to the club, so McRae shoots him and kills him."

McRae was traded along with Wayne Simpson to the Royals for Roger Nelson and Richie Scheinblum on December 1, 1972. McRae developed as a consistent designated hitter in the American League (AL). His playing career spanned 23 years, including 14 seasons with Kansas City. He was selected a three-time All-Star, he hit over .300 six times for the Royals and was named Designated Hitter of the Year three times both by The Sporting News and the Associated Press.

McRae led the AL batting title race entering the final game of the 1976 regular season which was a 5–3 loss to the Minnesota Twins at Royals Stadium on October 3. He lost out to teammate George Brett .3333 to .3326, with the race decided in the ninth inning when he grounded out to the shortstop immediately after Brett hit an inside-the-park home run to left field. He confronted Twins manager Gene Mauch on the field, with both being restrained by players and umpires. McRae accused Mauch of racism for allegedly ordering left fielder Steve Brye to let Brett's fly ball drop in front of him. His claim was declared unsubstantiated by a post-season league investigation. Oddly, the other two of the top four finishers that season, the Minnesota Twins' Rod Carew and Lyman Bostock, played in that same game. McRae did end up leading the AL with a .407 on-base percentage. The following season, he led the majors with 54 doubles.

After his recovery from the leg fracture, McRae became known as "the most aggressive baserunner of the 1970s," as quoted by James, "a man who left home plate thinking 'double' every time he hit the ball...he taught the younger players and reminded the veterans to take nothing for granted, and to take no prisoners on the bases." In game four of the 1980 World Series, McRae twice turned a seemingly routine single to center field into a two-base hit. McRae played hard—so hard, in fact, that the rule requiring a runner to slide into second base when breaking up a double play is still referred to as the Hal McRae Rule in honor of the man whose cross-body blocks into second base broke up a lot of double plays and second basemen at the same time.

In 1982, McRae had another outstanding year as he led the majors with 46 doubles and 133 RBI. He finished fourth in AL MVP voting.

In a 19-year major league career, McRae posted a .290 batting average (2091-for-7218) with 191 home runs, 1097 RBI, 484 doubles, 65 triples and 109 stolen bases in 2084 games played. He added a .351 on-base percentage and a .454 slugging average for a combined .805 OPS.

Managerial career
Following his playing retirement, McRae managed the Royals (1991–94) and Tampa Bay Devil Rays (2001–02). He also served as hitting coach for the Cincinnati Reds, Philadelphia Phillies, and St. Louis Cardinals. McRae, who won a World Series ring playing for Kansas City against the Cardinals in 1985, won a ring as a coach for the Cardinals when they defeated the Detroit Tigers in the 2006 World Series, four games to one.

His managing career is most memorable because of a tantrum he threw as Royals' manager early in the 1993 season while being interviewed by reporters after a Royals loss. The tantrum included throwing numerous objects around his office, and one reporter left McRae's office with a bloodied face. The tirade was captured on video and widely disseminated at the time. McRae was not fired and continued to manage after the incident.

Managerial records

See also
 List of Major League Baseball annual doubles leaders
 List of St. Louis Cardinals coaches
 Holy Cow! - Harry Caray with Bob Verdi.  Publisher: Villard Books, 1989.  Format: Hardcover, 252 pp. Language: English.  
The ESPN Baseball Encyclopedia – Gary Gillette, Peter Gammons, Pete Palmer. Publisher: Sterling Publishing, 2005. Format: Paperback, 1824pp. Language: English. 
The New Bill James Historical Baseball Abstract - Bill James.  Publisher: Free Press, 2001.  Format: Paperback, 1014 pp. Language: English.  
Baseball Confidential - Bruce Nash and Allan Zullo.  Publisher: Pocket Books, 1988.  Format: Paperback, 224 pp. Language: English.

References

External links

Managerial career statistics at Baseball-Reference
Baseball Reference (Minors)

1945 births
Living people
African-American baseball coaches
African-American baseball managers
African-American baseball players
American League RBI champions
American League All-Stars
Baseball players from Florida
Bradenton Explorers players
Buffalo Bisons (minor league) players
Cincinnati Reds coaches
Cincinnati Reds players
Florida A&M Rattlers baseball players
Florida Instructional League Reds players
Indianapolis Indians players
Kansas City Royals coaches
Kansas City Royals players
Kansas City Royals managers
Leones del Caracas players
American expatriate baseball players in Venezuela
Major League Baseball hitting coaches
Major League Baseball left fielders
Major League Baseball designated hitters
Montreal Expos coaches
Peninsula Grays players
People from Avon Park, Florida
Philadelphia Phillies coaches
Silver Slugger Award winners
St. Louis Cardinals coaches
Tampa Bay Devil Rays managers
Tampa Tarpons (1957–1987) players
Tiburones de La Guaira players
21st-century African-American people
20th-century African-American sportspeople